Mary Ellen Spring Rice (14 September 1880 – 1 December 1924) was an Irish nationalist activist during the early 20th century.

Biography

Spring Rice was born into an aristocratic Anglo-Irish family in London. She was the daughter of Thomas Spring Rice, 2nd Baron Monteagle of Brandon, and a great-granddaughter of the British Chancellor of the Exchequer, Thomas Spring Rice. Her maternal grandfather was the bishop, Samuel Butcher. She was brought up on the family's Mount Trenchard estate overlooking the River Shannon. It was a progressive, liberal household and independence of thought was encouraged. So too was the Gaelic culture and, at home, Spring Rice and her brothers were taught how to speak fluent Irish.

Before the First World War, Spring Rice hosted many Irish nationalist and Conradh na Gaeilge meetings at her home, and she became a close friend of Douglas Hyde and her cousin Nelly O'Brien. During 1913 and 1914, Spring Rice was actively involved in gun-running, most notably the Howth gun-running. 

This involved helping to ship weapons to be used in an Irish uprising from Germany into Ireland. Together with Molly Childers, she raised £2,000 towards the purchase of 900 Mauser rifles from Germany, many of which were used in the 1916 Easter Rising. Spring Rice sailed on the Asgard to collect the guns and helped to unload them in Ireland. 

During the Irish War of Independence, she allowed her Mount Trenchard home to be used as a safe house by Irish Republican Army fighters and the family boat was used to carry men and arms over the Shannon Estuary. 

Con Collins stayed with her regularly. She helped train local women as nurses to tend to wounded nationalists and acted as an IRA message carrier between Limerick and Dublin. Throughout this time, she maintained her aristocratic façade and society connections, inviting senior Liberal Party politicians to Mount Trenchard to pressure them to support Irish independence.

Death
Spring Rice started to suffer from tuberculosis in 1923, and died unmarried in a sanatorium in Clwdyy, Wales, on 1 December 1924. She was buried in Mount Trenchard, Loghill, County Limerick, Ireland. When her coffin arrived at Foynes railway station on 4 December 1924 it was greeted by several society members, including members of the Foynes Branch I.T.G.W.U. lined up in military formation. The following day, the entirety of the Foynes Branch I.T.G.W.U. attended the funeral

References

External links
 

1880 births
1924 deaths
Protestant Irish nationalists
Mary
Daughters of barons
People from County Limerick
Irish activists
Irish women activists
Irish Anglicans
20th-century Anglo-Irish people
Mary